Julieta may refer to:
Julieta (apple), a variety of apple
Julieta Madrigal, a character from Encanto
Julieta (name), a female given name, a variant of Julia

See also
, including many people with forename Julieta

Julia (disambiguation)